Rosemère is an affluent suburb of Montreal, in southwestern Quebec, Canada on the north shore of the Rivière des Mille Îles in the Thérèse-De Blainville Regional County Municipality. The town is noted for its green look, due to the high density of trees. Some wooded areas in the town have been left intact as the town has grown around them. Homes are mostly upscale, varying from renovated cottages to unique character homes. It is almost entirely residential, with no significant industries.  Boulevard Curé-Labelle, the town's main commercial artery, is lined up by suburban shops and shopping malls, the largest of which is Place Rosemère.

Its most famous resident is likely Alexandre Bilodeau, who became the first Canadian athlete to win an Olympic gold medal on Canadian soil. He won the men's moguls event at the 2010 Winter Olympics in Vancouver, British Columbia.

Demographics 

History
The area that would become Rosemère was first settled in 1714, with the establishment of the Mille-Îles Seigneury. By 1780, the seigneury was well established, with large tracts of land under cultivation. Rosemere was named by J.P. Withers, of the Canadian Pacific Railway, who moved to the area in 1880. At first he called his new home "Rose", after the many wild roses growing there. Later he added "mere" an old English word for a lake. The Rivière des Mille Îles is wide and has the appearance of a lake at this location. So the English meaning would be "lake of roses". After the town's incorporation, documents were forwarded to Quebec City, an accent was added to the middle 'e', according to statements by residents. In French, the name does not mean "Mother of Roses", which would be said "Mère des Roses" in French. The town's name has no sensible meaning in French, though in typical Canadian fashion, the name has become bilingual.

In the first half of the last century, Rosemère had several natural sandy beaches on the Rivière des Mille Îles and many cottages along the shoreline that were only used during the summer. These beaches fell into disuse in the early 1960s because of pollution. A majority of the year-round residents were francophone and many of the summer-only residents were anglophone.  After World War II, Rosemère was transformed into a bedroom community of Montreal with the construction of homes in farmland and forested areas northwest of Grande Cote. By 1964, 65% of Rosemère's residents were anglophone. While the French and English residents of Rosemère have always enjoyed the ambience of the area in harmony, the English population has declined over the years to today's 16% (2001 Canadian Census), but has since climbed to 19.89% (2006 Canadian Census).

The French- and English-speaking communities of Rosemère have been cohabitating for a long time, each of them leaving its own mark and institutions. In 1992, a public consultation process confirmed the desire of residents to preserve the Town of Rosemère's bilingual status.

Education
The Commission scolaire de la Seigneurie-des-Mille-Îles (CSSMI) operates French-language schools in the city.
École secondaire Hubert-Maisonneuve (lower secondary)
École primaire Alpha
École primaire Val-des-Ormes
Some students are zoned to École primaire du Ruisselet in Lorraine and École primaire de Fontainebleau in Blainville. Upper secondary students are zoned to École Polyvalente Sainte-Thérèse in Sainte-Thérèse or to École secondaire Rive-Nord in Bois-des-Filion.

Furthermore, the administration building for the Sir Wilfrid Laurier School Board which operates English-language schools found in the Laval, Laurentides and Lanaudière regions is located in Rosemère. It neighbours one of its secondary schools, Rosemere High School which also houses the English school board's educational and complementary services. The board also operates McCaig Elementary School, which is located in very close proximity to the high school, as it is located on the same street. McCaig and Rosemere High serve all areas of the municipality.

The francophone private school Académie Sainte-Thérèse has a campus in Rosemère. Externat Sacré-Cœur is also in the town.

Municipal chronology 
Population history, according to the Institut de la statistique du Québec:
  inhabitants (as of 1996);
  (as of 1997);
  (as of 1998);
  (as of 1999);
  (as of 2000);
  (as of 2001);
  (as of 2002);
  (as of 2003);
  (as of 2004);
  (as of 2005);
  (as of 2006);
  (as of 2007);
  (as of 2008);
  (as of 2011).

Transportation
Rosemère is connected to Montreal's Lucien-L'Allier Station by commuter rail via the Rosemère station of the Exo (Réseau de transport métropolitain) Saint-Jérôme line. Local bus service is provided by the RTM's CITL section.

Regional 
The city of Rosemère is part of the following regional boundaries:
 Administrative region: Laurentides;
 MRC: Thérèse-De Blainville;
 Provincial electoral district: Groulx;
 Federal electoral district: Rivière-des-Milles-Iles.

See also
Rivière aux Chiens (rivière des Mille Îles), a river

References

External links
City of Rosemère

Cities and towns in Quebec
Greater Montreal
Incorporated places in Laurentides